Onchidoris quadrimaculata is a species of sea slug, a dorid nudibranch, a shell-less marine gastropod mollusc in the family Onchidorididae.

Distribution
This species was described from Castle Harbor, Bermuda.

References

Onchidorididae
Gastropods described in 1900